Christian Ronaldo Sitepu is an Indonesian basketball player for Satria Muda Pertamina Jakarta and the Indonesia national basketball team.

Career statistics

Regular season

Playoffs

International

References

1986 births
Living people
Indonesian men's basketball players
People of Batak descent
Power forwards (basketball)
People from Bogor
ASEAN Basketball League players
Southeast Asian Games silver medalists for Indonesia
Southeast Asian Games medalists in basketball
Competitors at the 2011 Southeast Asian Games
Competitors at the 2015 Southeast Asian Games
Competitors at the 2017 Southeast Asian Games
Islamic Solidarity Games competitors for Indonesia